Village Defence Guards (VDGs) formerly known as Village Defence Committees is a militia formed in the mid-1990s in the Chenab Valley area of Jammu and Kashmir for the self-defence of locals especially Hindus in remote hilly villages against militancy. It consist of villagers as well as police officers.

As recently as 2019, the Jammu and Kashmir police set up new VDCs in Kishtwar. Kishtwar has over 3,251 VDC members out of which 800 are armed. In Jammu and Kashmir there are 4,125 VDCs as of December 2019. The Indian Army conducts training camps for VDCs consisting of weapons training and intelligence gathering basics. On 15 September 2019, the Army trained VDCs in Doda sector. They were mainly set up to protect Hindus and Muslims. Following the killing of a Kashmiri-Hindu Sarpanch in June 2020, former Jammu and Kashmir police chief said Shesh Paul Vaid that Hindus and Muslims could be armed and Village Defence Committees could be set up with proper planning. As of 28 February 2023, there are over 100 Hindu men armed and provided weapons training in Dhangri, Rajouri.The first VDC was set up under Shesh Paul Vaid when he was a Superintendent of police in Bagankote village, Udhampur (now Reasi) in 1995.

References 

Kashmir conflict
Kashmiri Hindus